Kalinkavichy is a town in Gomel Region, southeastern Belarus. Kalinkavichy is located beside the Netech' River, opposite the town of Mazyr, and is the site of one of the country's most important railway junctions. It has a population of 37,876 (2004 estimate). It has suffered radioactive fallout from the Chernobyl disaster.

History
Archaeological excavations have found traces of human settlement dating back to 26,000-24,000 years ago, the oldest yet discovered in Belarus.

The earliest historical mention of the town of Kalinkavičy dates to 1560. The town grew to prominence at the end of the nineteenth century with the coming of the railways.

Before World War II, a significant part of the population was Jewish, 3,386 out of 9,799 were Jews. Kalinkavichy was under German occupation from 22 August 1941 until 14 January 1944. Before the arrival of the German forces, a part of the Jewish population managed to evacuate the city by train.
On September 20, 1941, all the Jews were shot by collaborating policemen and German gendarmes in a trench.

Food processing (esp. pork products) is the largest industry. The extraction of peat (5.5 million tonnes of reserves) is also economically important.

Overview

Kalinkavičy is also known for the annual Avtyuki comedy festival, held every June.

In 1998, the town was united with the surrounding rural area to form a single administrative unit, Kalinkavičy Rajon, covering , with a total population of 71,500.

Notable Figures born in Kalinkavichy
One of the most notable figures born in Kalinkavicy was Solomon Simon (1895–1970), a well-known Yiddish author who emigrated to New York City in  1913. His autobiography, "My Jewish Roots," describes his early childhood years in Kalinkavichy (Kalinkovich). 
Katherine Locke, a stage and supporting screen actress of the 1930s and 40s was born in Kalinkavichy, prior to emigrating to the United States.
IDF General  (1905-1947)

References

External links

 Youtube: 3 июля 2018 года. КАЛИНКОВИЧИ ОТМЕТИЛИ ДЕНЬ НЕЗАВИСИМОСТИ

Populated places in Gomel Region
Towns in Belarus
Minsk Voivodeship
Rechitsky Uyezd
Kalinkavichy District